The Island Council of Saba is the legislative body of the Dutch special municipality of Saba. It consists of five members and elections take place every four years. The Island Council appoints and supervises the commissioners in the Executive Council. The Island Council is chaired by the Lieutenant Governor.

Composition

Current members
Currently there is only one political party represented in the Island Council: The Windward Islands People's Movement (WIPM) holds all five seats.

Former Members
Starting in 1951, five Island Council members were elected at large.  Members of the council, from 1951 to the present, are:

See also
Municipality of the Netherlands
Island council (Netherlands)
Island council (Netherlands Antilles)

References

Caribbean special municipalities of the Netherlands
Government of the Netherlands
Members of the Saba Island Council